The 2012 WGC-HSBC Champions was a golf tournament played 1–4 November 2012 at the Olazabal Course of Mission Hills Golf Club in Shenzhen, China. It was the fourth WGC-HSBC Champions tournament, and the fourth of four World Golf Championships events held in 2012. The event was won by Ryder Cup star Ian Poulter who shot consecutive rounds of 65 (−7) on the weekend and broke the tournament scoring record with 267 (−21) for his second WGC win. Two strokes back were runners-up Jason Dufner, Ernie Els, Phil Mickelson, and Scott Piercy.

Field
The following is a list of players who have qualified for the 2012 WGC-HSBC Champions. Players who have qualified from multiple categories are listed in the first category in which they are eligible. The numbers of other qualifying categories are in parentheses next to the player's name.

1. Winners of the four major championships and The Players Championship
Ernie Els (12), Bubba Watson (12)
Qualified but did not play: Matt Kuchar (12), Rory McIlroy (3,10,12), Webb Simpson (12)

2. Winners of the previous four World Golf Championships
Keegan Bradley (12), Martin Kaymer, Justin Rose (12)
Qualified but did not play: Hunter Mahan (3,12)

3. Winners of the top 23 rated PGA Tour  events (32 events met rating)
Luke Donald (5,12), Jason Dufner (12), Bill Haas, Marc Leishman, Phil Mickelson (12), Carl Pettersson, Scott Piercy, Brandt Snedeker (12), Kyle Stanley, Johnson Wagner, Nick Watney (12)
Qualified but did not play: Rickie Fowler, Tommy Gainey, Zach Johnson (12), Steve Stricker (12), Tiger Woods (12)

4. Top 5 available players from the FedEx Cup points list
Robert Garrigus, Dustin Johnson (12), Louis Oosthuizen (8,10,12), Adam Scott (12), Lee Westwood (5,8,12)
Qualified but did not play: Jim Furyk (12), Sergio García (12), Ryan Moore, Bo Van Pelt (9,12)

5. Winners of the top 23 rated European Tour events (22 events met rating)
Rafa Cabrera-Bello, Nicolas Colsaerts, Jamie Donaldson, Gonzalo Fernández-Castaño (10), Branden Grace (8), Peter Hanson (12), Paul Lawrie, Shane Lowry, Francesco Molinari, Julien Quesne, Álvaro Quirós, Richie Ramsay, Robert Rock, Marcel Siem, Jeev Milkha Singh, Thongchai Jaidee, Danny Willett

6. Top 5 available players from the Race to Dubai
David Lynn, Graeme McDowell (12), Thorbjørn Olesen, Ian Poulter (9), Bernd Wiesberger (10)

7. Five players - winners of the top Japan Golf Tour events, remainder from Order of Merit (14 events met rating)
Hiroyuki Fujita, Yuta Ikeda (OoM), Brendan Jones (OoM), Toshinori Muto, Tadahiro Takayama 
Qualified but did not play: Toru Taniguchi

8. Five players - winners of the top Sunshine Tour events, remainder from Order of Merit (5 events met rating)
Thomas Aiken (OoM), George Coetzee (OoM), Garth Mulroy, Hennie Otto, Jaco van Zyl (OoM)

9. Five players - winners of the top PGA Tour of Australasia events, remainder from Order of Merit (4 events met rating)
Robert Allenby (OoM), Greg Chalmers, Marcus Fraser (OoM), Brad Kennedy (OoM), John Senden (OoM)

10. Nine players - winners of the top Asian Tour events, remainder from Order of Merit (8 events met rating)
Gaganjeet Bhullar (OoM), Scott Hend (OoM), Masanori Kobayashi (OoM), Jbe' Kruger, David Lipsky (OoM), Joost Luiten, Prom Meesawat (OoM), Siddikur Rahman (OoM), Thaworn Wiratchant (OoM)

11. Four players from China
Hu Mu, Liang Wenchong, Wu Ashun, Zhang Xinjun

12. Any players, not included in above categories, in the top 25 of the OWGR on October 15, 2012

13. If needed to fill the field of 78 players, winners of additional tournaments, ordered by field strength (9 from PGA Tour, 9 from Japan Golf Tour), alternating with those players ranked after the top 25 in OWGR on October 15, 2012
Players in bold were added to the field through this category. Players listed in "()" already qualified in a previous category. Players listed with their name stricken did not play or were not listed as alternates when the field was announced.

12 players were appearing in their first WGC event: Robert Garrigus, Scott Hend, Hu Mu, Jang Ik-jae, Brad Kennedy, Kim Hyung-sung, Masanori Kobayashi, Han Lee, David Lipsky, David Lynn, Thorbjørn Olesen and Julien Quesne.

Past champions in the field 

As a WGC event (2009–present)

Round summaries

First round
Thursday, 1 November 2012

Second round
Friday, 2 November 2012

Third round
Saturday, 3 November 2012

Final round
Sunday, 4 November 2012

Scorecard

Cumulative tournament scores, relative to par
Source:

Video
Golf Channel – 2012 WGC-HSBC – final round highlights

References

External links
Coverage on Asian Tour's official site
Coverage on European Tour's official site

WGC-HSBC Champions
WGC-HSBC Champions
WGC-HSBC Champions
WGC-HSBC Champions